Cyril George Butcher (31 July 1909 – 23 February 1987) was an English actor and director and longtime companion of Beverley Nichols.

Biography
Butcher was born on 31 July 1909, in Suffolk, England.

In 1930, the magazine Film Weekly sponsored a pair of film acting scholarships. The two winners (Cyril Butcher and Aileen Despard) went on to appear in the now lost Alfred Hitchcock short An Elastic Affair and placed under contract by British International Pictures.

In the early 1930s, he met novelist and playwright Beverley Nichols and they remained lifelong partners from then. Their friends were Hugh Walpole and Lord Berners, among others. In 1939 Butcher was living with Nichols and a valet at 1 Ellerdale  Close, Hampstead, London.

In 1934, he published In Extremis, Worst Moments in the Lives of the Famous with a foreword by Beverley Nichols. In 1939, together with Albert Arlen, he directed the play Counterfeit! at the Duke of York's, London.

In 1953, Butcher adapted Evensong by Beverley Nichols for the television, while in 1956 he directed the television adaptation of Macadam and Eve from the play by Roger Macdougall.  Butcher was the producer of the 1957 television drama Granite Peak.

Between 1959 and 1963, he directed for television: Ideal Home Exhibition (1963), The English Captain (1960), The Last Hours (1959), Old People; Part 1 (1959) and Election Results 1959 (1959).

On the death of Nichols in 1984, Butcher was the main beneficiary in his will, amounting to £131,750 (£ in  sterling).

Butcher died on 23 February 1987 at Sudbrook Cottage, the house he shared with Nichols, at Ham Common in Richmond, Surrey.

References

External links
Cyril Butcher at IMDb

1909 births
1987 deaths
20th-century English male actors
English male film actors
English theatre directors
LGBT theatre directors
20th-century English LGBT people
People from Richmond, London
Male actors from Suffolk